Mal Waldron with the Steve Lacy Quintet is an album by American jazz pianist Mal Waldron and soprano saxophonist Steve Lacy released on the French America label in 1972. The original LP release featured three tracks and the 2005 CD reissue added two alternate takes.

Track listing
All compositions by Steve Lacy except as indicated
 “Vio” (Waldron) - 18:24  
 “Jump for Victor” - 8:54  
 “Blue Wee” - 12:32  
 “Vio” [alternate take] (Waldron) - 12:37  
 “Jump for Victor” [alternate take] - 9:07  
Recorded in Paris, May 1972

Personnel
Steve Lacy - soprano saxophone
Mal Waldron - piano 
Steve Potts - soprano & alto saxophones
Irene Aebi - cello, voice 
Kent Carter - double bass 
Noel McGhee - drums & percussion

References

1972 albums
Steve Lacy (saxophonist) albums
Mal Waldron albums
America Records albums
Collaborative albums